The orthopteran family Rhaphidophoridae of the suborder Ensifera has a worldwide distribution. Common names for these insects include jumping wētā, cave wētā, cave crickets, camelback crickets, camel crickets, Hogan bugs, spider crickets (sometimes shortened to "criders" or "sprickets"),land shrimp, and sand treaders. Those occurring in New Zealand and Australia are typically referred to as jumping or cave wētā. Most are found in forest environments or within caves, animal burrows, cellars, under stones, or in wood or  similar environments. All species are flightless and nocturnal, usually with long antennae and legs. More than 500 species of Rhaphidophoridae are described.

The well-known field crickets are from a different superfamily (Grylloidea) and only look vaguely similar, while members of the family Tettigoniidae may look superficially similar in body form.

Description

Most cave crickets have very large hind legs with "drumstick-shaped" femora and equally long, thin tibiae, and long, slender antennae. The antennae arise closely and next to each other on the head. The bodies of early instars may appear translucent.

As their name suggests, cave crickets are commonly found in caves or old mines. However, species are also known to inhabit other cool, damp environments such as rotten logs, stumps and hollow trees, and under damp leaves, stones, boards, and logs. Occasionally, they prove to be a nuisance in the basements of homes in suburban areas, drains, sewers, wells, and firewood stacks. One has become a tramp species from Asia and is now found in hothouses in Europe and North America. Some reach into alpine areas and live close to permanent ice, such as the Mount Cook "flea" (Pharmacus montanus) and its relatives in New Zealand.

Subfamilies and genera

Aemodogryllinae
Genera include:
 tribe Aemodogryllini Jacobson, 1905 - Asia (Korea, Indochina, Russia, China), Europe
 Diestrammena Brunner von Wattenwyl, 1888
 Tachycines Adelung, 1902
 tribe Diestramimini Gorochov, 1998 - India, southern China, Indochina
 Diestramima Storozhenko, 1990
 Gigantettix Gorochov, 1998

Ceuthophilinae
cave crickets, camel crickets and sand treaders: North America
Genera include:
 tribe Argyrtini Saussure & Pictet, 1897
 Anargyrtes Hubbell, 1972
 Argyrtes Saussure & Pictet, 1897
 Leptargyrtes Hubbell, 1972
 tribe Ceuthophilini Tepper, 1892
 Ceuthophilus Scudder, 1863
 Macrobaenetes Tinkham, 1962
 Rhachocnemis Caudell, 1916
 Styracosceles Hubbell, 1936
 Typhloceuthophilus Hubbell, 1940
 Udeopsylla Scudder, 1863
 Utabaenetes Tinkham, 1970
 tribe Daihiniini Karny, 1930
 Ammobaenetes Hubbell, 1936
 Daihinia Haldeman, 1850
 Daihinibaenetes Tinkham, 1962
 Daihiniella Hubbell, 1936
 Daihiniodes Hebard, 1929
 Phrixocnemis Scudder, 1894
 tribe Hadenoecini Ander, 1939 - North America
 Euhadenoecus Hubbell, 1978
 Hadenoecus Scudder, 1863
 tribe Pristoceuthophilini Rehn, 1903
 Exochodrilus Hubbell, 1972
 Farallonophilus Rentz, 1972
 Pristoceuthophilus Rehn, 1903
 Salishella Hebard, 1939

Dolichopodainae
cave crickets: southern Europe, western Asia

 Dolichopoda Bolivar, 1880

Gammarotettiginae
Auth. Karny, 1937 - North America
 tribe Gammarotettigini Karny, 1937
 Gammarotettix Brunner von Wattenwyll, 1888

Macropathinae
Gondwanan cave crickets
Genera include:
 tribe Macropathini Karny, 1930 - Australia, Chile, New Zealand, the Falkland Islands
Australotettix Richards, 1964 – Australia (Queensland, New South Wales)
 Cavernotettix Richards, 1966 – Australia (New South Wales, Victoria)
 Dendroplectron Richards, 1964 – New Zealand
 Heteromallus Brunner von Wattenwyll, 1888
 Insulanoplectron Richards, 1970 – New Zealand
 Ischyroplectron Hutton, 1896 – New Zealand
 Isoplectron Hutton, 1896 – New Zealand
 Macropathus Walker, 1869 – New Zealand
 Maotoweta Johns & Cook, 2014 – New Zealand
 Micropathus Richards, 1964 – Australia (Tasmania)
Miotopus Hutton, 1898 - New Zealand
Neonetus Brunner von Wattenwyll, 1888 – New Zealand
Notoplectron Richards, 1964
Novoplectron Richards, 1966 – New Zealand
Novotettix Richards, 1966 – Australia (South Australia)
Pachyrhamma Brunner von Wattenwyll, 1888 – New Zealand
Pallidoplectron Richards, 1958 – New Zealand
Pallidotettix Richards, 1968 – Australia (South Australia, Western Australia)
Paraneonetus Salmon, 1958 – New Zealand
Parudenus Enderlein, 1910
Parvotettix Richards, 1968 – Australia (Tasmania)
Petrotettix Richards, 1972 – New Zealand
Pharmacus Pictet & Saussure, 1893 – New Zealand
Pleioplectron Hutton, 1896 – New Zealand
Setascutum Richards, 1972 – New Zealand
Spelaeiacris Peringuey, 1916
Speleotettix Chopard, 1944 – Australia (Victoria, South Australia)
Tasmanoplectron Richards, 1971 – Australia (Tasmania)
Udenus Brunner von Wattenwyll, 1900

 tribe Talitropsini Gorochov, 1988
Talitropsis Bolivar, 1882 – New Zealand

† Protroglophilinae
 † Prorhaphidophora Chopard, 1936
 † Protroglophilus Gorochov, 1989

Rhaphidophorinae
Genera include:
 tribe Rhaphidophorini Walker, 1869 - India, southern China, Japan, Indochina, Malaysia, Australasia
 Eurhaphidophora Gorochov, 1999
 Rhaphidophora Serville, 1838
 Stonychophora Karny, 1934

Troglophilinae
cave crickets: the Mediterranean region
 Troglophilus Krauss, 1879

Tropidischiinae
camel crickets: Canada
 Tropidischia Scudder, 1869

An as-yet-unnamed genus was discovered within a cave in Grand Canyon–Parashant National Monument, on the Utah/Arizona border, in 2005. Its most distinctive characteristic is that it has functional grasping cerci on its posterior.

Ecology
Their distinctive limbs and antennae serve a double purpose. Typically living in a lightless environment, or active at night, they rely heavily on their sense of touch, which is limited by reach. While they have been known to take up residence in the basements of buildings, many cave crickets live out their entire lives deep inside  caves. In those habitats, they sometimes face long spans of time with insufficient access to nutrients.  Given their limited vision, cave crickets often jump to avoid predation. Those species of Rhaphidophoridae that have been studied are primarily scavengers, eating plant, animal, and fungi material. Although they look intimidating, they are completely harmless.

The group known as "sand treaders" is restricted to sand dunes, and are adapted to live in this environment. They are active only at night, and spend the day burrowed into the sand to minimize water loss. In the large sand dunes of California and Utah, they serve as food for scorpions and at least one specialized bird, LeConte's thrasher (Toxostoma lecontei).  The thrasher roams the dunes looking for the tell-tale debris of the diurnal hiding place and excavates the sand treaders (the range of bird is in the Mojave and Colorado Deserts in the U.S.).

Interactions with humans

Cave and camel crickets are of little economic importance except as a nuisance in buildings and homes, especially basements. They are usually "accidental invaders" that wander in from adjacent areas. They may reproduce indoors, and are seen in dark, moist conditions such as a basement, shower, or laundry area, as well as in organic debris (e.g., compost heaps) that serve as food. They are fairly common invaders of homes in Hokkaido and other chilly regions in Japan. They are called kamado-uma or colloquially benjo korogi (literally, "toilet cricket").

A representation of a female from the Troglophilus genus has been found engraved on a bison bone in the Cave of the Trois-Frères, showing that they were likely already present around humans, maybe as pets or pests, in caves inhabited by prehistoric populations in the Magdalenian.

References

External links
 
 

 
Orthoptera families
Cave insects
Blind animals